Medina General Hospital is a tertiary private hospital operating under Medina College, Inc. since June 1963. It is a base hospital of its main campus in Ozamiz City, Medina College-Ozamiz. It is one of the leading general hospitals in the country, with doctors that are deemed expert in different fields of medicine, including, pediatrics, geriatrics, cardiology, nephrology, neurology, oncology and surgical oncology, general surgery, orthopedics, pulmonology, and anesthesiology. As of February 2016, the hospital has equipped itself with 250 beds and in October 2017, new patient wards have been officially opened.

The hospital is situated at Ozamiz City, and has been used both primarily as a private health care unit and as well as teaching and training facility for health care workers to earn experience to further their career.

History
June 1963 has seen the birth of the first ever Medina College which was founded in Ozamiz City by Dr. Rico Macan Medina, Sr. and his wife, Dr. Beatriz Crisostomo Medina. Back then, the college was named the Medina School of Midwifery, which was the first of its kind in the city.

While experiencing continuous development during the post-Marcos era, among the biggest challenges the school has faced is coping up with the demands of modern education. This has led Medina College, Inc. to eventually undergo an expansion program, which resulted to an improved set of physical facilities and establishment of the Medina General Hospital in the same period.

In 2006, the hospital was renovated to accommodate more patients. The hospital has made it to 250 beds as of February 2016 and in October 2017, new patient wards have been officially opened.

Related institutions
 Medina College-Ozamiz
 Medina Foundation College
 Medina College-Pagadian
 Medina College-Ipil

References

Hospital buildings completed in 1963
Hospital buildings completed in 2006
Hospitals in the Philippines
Buildings and structures in Ozamiz
Hospitals established in 1963
21st-century architecture in the Philippines
20th-century architecture in the Philippines